Tracy Kay Camp (born September 27, 1964) is an American computer scientist noted for her research on wireless networking. She is also noted for her leadership in broadening participation in computing. She was the co-chair of CRA-W from 2011 to 2014 and she was
the co-chair of ACM-W from 1998 to 2002.

Biography
Camp received a B.A. in Mathematics from Kalamazoo College in 1987. She received a M.S. in Computer Science from Michigan State University in 1989 and a Ph.D in Computer Science from  The College of William & Mary in 1993.

She then joined the Department of Computer Science at the University of Alabama as an assistant professor in 1993. In 1998 she moved to the Colorado School of Mines as an assistant professor, and was then promoted 
to associate professor in 2000 and to professor in 2007. 
In 2010–11, she was interim head of Mathematical and Computer Sciences and then 
interim head of Electrical Engineering and Computer Science. In this role, she helped lead this re-organization of the university. She is currently Head of the Department of Computer Science at Colorado School of Mines.

Awards
In 2012 she 
was named an ACM Fellow.

Her other notable awards include:
 ACM Fellow (2012)
 IEEE Fellow (2016)

References

External links
 Colorado School of Mines: Tracy Kay Camp, Department of Computer Science

American women computer scientists
American computer scientists
Colorado School of Mines faculty
Fellows of the Association for Computing Machinery
Living people
1964 births
Scientists from Detroit
American women academics
21st-century American women